The Antilles coqui (Eleutherodactylus johnstonei), commonly known as the Montserrat whistling frog, Barbados whistling frog, or the Lesser Antillean whistling frog, is a species of frog in the family Eleutherodactylidae found in Bermuda, the Caribbean and northern South America.
Its natural habitats are subtropical or tropical moist lowland forest, subtropical or tropical moist montane forest, subtropical or tropical moist shrubland, subtropical or tropical dry lowland grassland, arable land, pastureland, plantations, rural gardens, urban areas, and heavily degraded former forests.

They can also be found in Bermuda where they are known as whistling frogs or tree frogs.

References

External links

Eleutherodactylus
Amphibians of the Caribbean
Amphibians described in 1914
Taxonomy articles created by Polbot